Lochee is an area in the west of Dundee, Scotland. Until the 19th century, it was a separate town, but was eventually surrounded by the expanding Dundee. It is notable for being home to Camperdown Works, which was the largest jute production site in the world.

History

'Lochee' originally referred to the area in which weavers' cottages were situated at the burn which flowed through Balgay Lochee; thus, they were at the eye of the loch or Loch E'e, which eventually became Lochee. It is believed this site is close to where Myrekirk stands today. Indeed, John Ainslie's map of 1794 makes reference to 'Locheye' on the north and south banks of the burn. However, G. Taylor and A. Skinner's 'Survey and maps of the roads of North Britain or Scotland' in 1776 makes reference to 'Lochee'.

When the loch was drained by the Duncans in the 15th century they offered crofting tenancies along the burn. One of the tenancies went to a Dutchman, James Cox and his family. After a change of name and with a reputation for quality linen, the Cox family eventually set up as linen merchants in 1700.

By 1760 the firm had 300 weavers and after using steam power and moving into the jute industry the family built Camperdown Works in 1864, said to be the largest factory in the world, with over 5,000 employees. Cox’s Stack, the 86 m (282 ft) high campanile-style factory chimney designed by local architect James MacLaren, survives. Lochee became a company town with 2 railway stations, police force, fire service, schools, swimming pool, casino, library, washhouse and several churches.

In 1890, the Cox Brothers donated a 25 acre public park to Lochee.

Lochee is well known for being the home of Dundee's biggest ever gang, 'The Lochee Fleet' who were notorious in Dundee's gang culture throughout the 70's and 90's.

Immigration

Many immigrants were attracted to the area by the prospect of employment in the city's jute mills. By 1855, there were 14,000 Irish immigrants in Dundee, most of whom stayed in Lochee, or 'Little Tipperary' as it would come to be known. In 1904, the Lochee Harp football club was formed by Lochee Irishmen as a means of recreation for the poor immigrants; the club still plays to this day.

Lochee is still regarded as Dundee's Irish 'quarter'.

Notable Lochee residents
See also :Category:People from Lochee

George Barnes, politician
Henry Bradley, cattle driver (Canada), Boxer and wine importer
W. Lindsay Cable, book Illustrator for Punch and Enid Blyton was born in Lochee
William Cooper, ship captain, politician (Prince Edward Island)
James Crabb, classical musician
John Duncan, footballer
William Eassie, railway contractor and manufacturer of prefabricated wooden buildings
Robert Fleming, banker
George Galloway, politician
Frank Gilfeather, journalist, broadcaster and author
Sir Alexander Gray, poet
James 'Napper' Thomson, Businessman
Michael Marra, musician

Demographics
	                    Lochee | Scotland

Total Population (2011)	5218	|  5,254,800
% children (2011)	17.63%	|  17.38%
% working age (2011)	58.49	|  62.79%
% pensionable age (2011)	23.88%	|  19.83%
% income deprived (2005, Barl 2012)	27%	|  14%
% 16-24 year olds claiming Jobseeker’s Allowance (2012 Q4)	16.2%	|  5.70%
% 25-49 year olds claiming Jobseeker’s Allowance (2012 Q4)	13.7%	|  4.20%
% 50-64 year olds claiming Jobseeker’s Allowance (2012 Q4)	4.6%	|  2.10%
% working age who are employment deprived (2008)	25%	|  12%
% 16-24 year olds claiming Key Benefits (2012 Q4)	29.2%	|  12.70%
% 25-49 year olds claiming Key Benefits (2012 Q4)	37.6%	|  15.40%
% 50-64 year olds claiming Key Benefits (2012 Q4)	32.1%	|  19%
Est. % prescribed drugs for anxiety, depression or psychosis (2004)	12%	|  8%
Number of SIMD crimes per 10000 (2007/08)	697	
% people within 0–500 metres of any Derelict site (2012)	91.6%	|  30.90%

References

Areas of Dundee
Irish diaspora in Scotland